Società Sportiva Matelica Calcio 1921, commonly referred to as Matelica, is an Italian football club founded in 1921 and based in Matelica, Marche. Currently it plays in Italy's Prima Categoria.

History

Foundation 
The club was founded in 1921.

Serie D 
In the season 2012-13 the team was promoted for the first time, from Eccellenza Marche to Serie D.

In the 2019–20 season, Matelica was promoted to Serie C for the first time in the club's history.

Serie C, merger with Anconitana and restart from amateur leagues 
In June 2021, Matelica owner Mauro Canil and Anconitana announced their intention to move towards a merger between the two clubs, the resulting entity being based in Ancona under the temporary denomination of "Ancona-Matelica", with the aim to have it changed to "Ancona" by 2022, pending approval by the Italian Football Federation.

In July 2021, the club was merged with Ancona-Matelica. As part of the merger, all logos and naming rights of Matelica were given away to Prima Categoria club G.S. Corrado Fabiani Matelica, chaired by Sabrina Orlandi, Mauro Canil's wife.

Colors and badge 
The team's colors are white and red.

Presidential history 

 ... (1921-1937)
 Riccardo Acqualagna (1937-1939)
 ... (1939-1944)
 Inactive (1944-1946)
 Achille Roversi (1946-1948)
 Inactive (1948-1950)
 Isidoro Belluco (1950-1952)
 Mellito Papi (1952-1953)
 Galliano Boldrini (1953-1957)
 ... (1957-1960)
 Giuseppe Ottalina (1960-1961)
 Emilio Acqualagna (1961-1963)
 Giuseppe Baldini (1963-1967)
 ... (1967-1970)
 Emilio Acqualagna (1970-1972)
 Giuseppe Baldini (1972-1973)
 Emilio Acqualagna (1973-1976)
 Renato Brancaleoni (1976-1980)
 Giuseppe Vico (1980-1981)
 Pietro Mataloni (1981-1982)
 Oreste Cesari (1982-1988)
 Gino Marcella (1988-1990)
 Pietro Lucernoni (1990-1995)
 Ezio Scalamonti (1995-1997)
 Silvano Passero (1997-2010)
 Mauro Canil (2010-)

Honours 
Serie D: 12019-20Coppa Italia Serie D: 12018-19Eccellenza: 12012-13Promozione: 12011-12Prima Categoria: 41970-71, 1972-73, 1989-90, 2010-11Seconda Categoria: 11983-84Coppa Italia Promozione Marche: 1'''
2011-12

References

External links
Official website 

Football clubs in Italy
Association football clubs established in 1921
Football clubs in the Marche
1921 establishments in Italy
2021 establishments in Italy
Serie C clubs
Serie D clubs
Matelica